The National Intelligence Service is the name of several state security agencies:

National Intelligence Service (Albania)
National Intelligence Service (Bulgaria)
National Intelligence Service (Burundi)
National Intelligence Service (Greece)  
National Intelligence Service (Kenya)
National Intelligence Service (Peru)
National Intelligence Service (South Africa)
National Intelligence Service (South Korea)
Intelligence Bureau (India)
Research and Analysis Wing (India)

Others
Servicio de Inteligencia Naval (Argentina)
Servicio de Inteligencia del Ejército (Argentina)
Servicio de Inteligencia de la Fuerza Aérea (Argentina)
Servicio de Inteligencia Militar (Dominican Republic)

See also
Intelligence agency
Foreign Intelligence service (disambiguation)
State Intelligence Service (disambiguation)
Federal Intelligence Service (disambiguation)
General Intelligence Directorate (disambiguation)
Directorate of Military Intelligence (disambiguation)
Intelligence Bureau (disambiguation)